Cornelis Pieter "Niels" van der Zwan (born 25 June 1967 in Scheveningen, South Holland) is a former rower from the Netherlands, who competed for his native country at the 1996 Summer Olympics in Atlanta, Georgia. There he won the gold medal  with the Holland Acht (Holland Eights). He also competed at the 1992 and 2000 Summer Olympics.

References
  Dutch Olympic Committee

1967 births
Living people
Dutch male rowers
Rowers at the 1992 Summer Olympics
Rowers at the 1996 Summer Olympics
Rowers at the 2000 Summer Olympics
Olympic rowers of the Netherlands
Olympic gold medalists for the Netherlands
Sportspeople from The Hague
Olympic medalists in rowing
Medalists at the 1996 Summer Olympics